The VAZ-2108, known as the Lada Samara in much of Western Europe (codenamed and later officially badged as the Lada Sputnik in its native Russia), is a series of small family cars produced by Soviet/Russian vehicle manufacturer AvtoVAZ under the Lada brand between 1984 and 2013. The model name Samara originally was used only for exported models, in the Soviet Union the same model was called Sputnik ("fellow traveler", "satellite") until 1991, when the sedan version of the Samara entered in production, using the export name. It was the first front-wheel drive serial car built in the Soviet Union after the LuAZ-969V. The Samara had been modified and restyled during the years of production before it was finally discontinued in December 2013.

Introduction
[[File:Lada_%287906566374%29_%282%29.jpg|thumb|rigt|Trollge-2004 Monster (9-door), shotgun 2 bulletsNiva SUV), and the first model not based on the Fiat 124 mechanicals.

Development

VAZ had made their first front-wheel drive prototype, the VAZ-1101, in the early 1970s. The engine from the Fiat 127 was used. Further development of this project led to the  Ladoga three-door hatchback prototype in 1976. The decision to build the Samara was taken on 16 September 1978, the intention being to build a car with strong potential sales in Western European export markets. Proposals for a distinctive saloon, four-door, and both three- and five-door hatchback were considered; it was decided instead the saloon should share the three-door hatchback's sheetmetal forward of the C-pillar. (Design work on the four-door went toward the VAZ-2110 instead.) During its development, VAZ designers paid careful attention to the contemporary Renault 9, Volkswagen Golf, Ford Escort Mark III, Opel Kadett, and Volvo 340, which would be the new VAZ-2108's main competitors. Front suspension was MacPherson struts, rear by torsion bar. It also had rack and pinion steering, another Soviet first.

On 31 December 1979, the first VAZ-2108 prototype was completed. It strongly resembled the earlier Ladoga, and the VAZ-1106 saloon. While named Sputnik at home, it was more commonly known as the Vos'merka ("Eighth") after the last digit in the model code. The export version was named after the Samara River, a tributary to the Volga. The first cars left the production line on 18 December 1984. These, the three-door hatchbacks (the only model available at first), were powered by a belt-driven SOHC  inline-four, and were fitted with a four-speed gearbox. (The head was developed in co-operation with Porsche, though most Western observers assumed Porsche's involvement went beyond just engines, and the carburetors in connection with Solex.)

The 1099 was an export-only variant. In 1989, the 21099 saloon followed, which had a new bonnet, grille, wings, and -longer rear overhang, as well as an improved dashboard. The 21099's front-end styling was adopted on the 2109 in 1992 and the 2108 in 1994.

A number of other minor alterations followed, including fuel-injected engines to meet emissions regulations in export markets. On the earlier Samaras the front clip had been a separate piece, surrounding the headlights. On the sedan version, the fenders go all the way up to the headlights and the lip of the bonnet dips between the headlights and meets the slimmer grille. Full production of the 21099 began in December 1990, with models 210993 (1288), 21099 (1499). The saloon, intended as a premium model compared to the hatchback, was given a distinctive branding in some export markets: Diva (Belgium), Sagona (France), Forma (Germany). Belgium also offered a locally built convertible. The 1.1 and 1.3 were eventually taken out of production, having already been withdrawn from export markets.

Special models
A Wankel engined Samara three-door hatchback, the 2108–91, powered by a two-rotor VAZ-415 (with two  rotors) was sold in Russia only, and only in very small numbers. With a five-speed gearbox, it was priced at 56,000 rubles. The subsequent 2109-91 five-door hatchback had the same VAZ-415 and gearbox.

There was also a rear-engined Samara 4x4 rally car, also known as the NAMI 0290, built for the 1985 Soyuz Rally; it had permanent four-wheel drive and a   Zhiguli-based engine, over the rear axle. It was nicknamed Appelsin ("orange", for its paint), and used ZAZ-1102 doors (though the body was mostly fiberglass, weighing only ) and still using factory Samara wheels.

The only component left untouched was the original Zhuguli 2106 block.

An even more powerful Samara S-Proto appeared in 1989, putting out . Most notably, the Samara T3 came seventh in class in the 1990 Paris-Dakar Rally and fifth in 1991, piloted by Jacky Ickx. The T3 did not contain many Samara parts however, using the Porsche 959's four-wheel drive system and a 3.6-litre Porsche flat-six. It was developed by French concessionaire Lada-Poch together with NAMI and the Tupolev aircraft factory. In the mid-1980s Lada developed its first ever convertible car on its own, then actually entering production and quickly exported to most European countries, called the Lada Natasha Cabriolet, a four-seater convertible that was based on the popular Samara 1300/1500 models with a manual opening and closing canvas roof. Also in some European car markets the LADA Niva 4X4 1600 cc engine was also available for both the Lada Natasha and Lada Samara cars during the 1990s.

Exports

The Samara was sold all across the world, from Australia to Canada, in most European countries and throughout the COMECON sphere. The build quality of the Samara was better than that of most Eastern European models. In most nations, versions and equipments were decided on and installed by the dealers themselves. These local varieties ranged from decals and badges to the convertible conversions offered in Belgium and Germany. The Samara was often sold under other names as well, in particular the VAZ 21099 (Samara Sedan), which was sold as the Sagona (France, Canada, and Spain), Diva (Belgium and the Netherlands), Forma (Germany) and Sable (Australia and New Zealand).

It was engineered in right-hand drive for the UK market, where it was sold from November 1987. It was sold there until VAZ withdrew from the UK market in July 1997, and was the most popular Lada model sold in the UK during the 23 years that the brand was sold there.

In certain markets where the tax structure benefited diesels (such as France and the Benelux), the Samara was available with a 1.5-litre Peugeot diesel engine in 1995–97.

With VAZ facing financial hardships in 1996–1997, exports began coming to a halt. The Lada Samara disappeared from Canada after the 1997 model year, leaving the Niva as the only Lada sold in Canada for the 1998 model year. Exports to Australia and Great Britain ended around the same time. The biggest problem was GM's reluctance to sell the fuel-injection kits necessary for exports, as they doubted VAZ's ability to pay. Faced with parts shortages, tax problems, and the chaos and criminality of Russia in the mid-nineties, export efforts languished and RHD production was no longer feasible.

As a partial response to this situation, a higher-quality version for the European market, the Lada EuroSamara or Samara Baltic in some markets, was assembled in Finland at the Valmet Automotive plant in Uusikaupunki. Production started in mid-1996 and ended in July 1998, with 14,000 cars made from 85 per cent Russian parts.

British market
The United Kingdom had to wait nearly three years for the Samara to go on sale, after its launch in the USSR, but sales were reasonably strong when the first versions of the car left forecourts, in November 1987.

In a road test conducted by The Motor magazine, it scored more than 5 points out of 10 in most aspects and was praised for having a remarkably extensive list of standard equipment, "impressive" engine, good visibility and performance for its price segment, lowered fuel consumption, being good at cornering and "tolerably quiet", but also received criticism for having a cheap-looking interior and plastic mouldings and being "very turbulent" on poor roads.

The £4,795 price at introduction "was much less expensive" than the competing Peugeot 309 or Ford Escort 1300. The Samara remained on sale in the United Kingdom right up to 4 July 1997, when the decision was made to withdraw from Great Britain and most other export markets.
In countries where ruggedness was more important, it was more successful, selling reasonably well in Canada, Australia, and Finland for instance.

The attempt to appeal to a wider clientele failed; while an improvement over previous Ladas, the Samara's higher price pitched it against stiffer West European competition.

By the time of the Samara's launch, the British small family car market was effectively split into two segments: The large mainstream market was dominated by mass-market manufacturers, such as Ford, Vauxhall, and Volkswagen. The budget market consisted of Eastern European and Far Eastern brands, such as Škoda, FSO, Hyundai, and Proton.

The aging Samara came bottom of the annual 1996 and 1997 JD Power and Top Gear surveys in Great Britain. In countries where ruggedness was more important, it did manage some success, selling reasonably well in Canada, Australia, and Finland for instance.

Versions
Initially sold as a three- or five-door hatchback with a 1.3 petrol engine, a 1.5 version became available in October 1988. Metallic paint became an option for the first time in November 1989 when the 1.5 SLX was launched. A new entry-level model arrived in July 1990 when the 1.1 petrol engine was added to the range (Select or L). An updated version of the Samara was launched in April 1991, with all new trim levels. This was followed by the introduction of the VAZ 21099 saloon version 15 months later. The saloon also became available as a sporty 1.5 "Juno" from July 1994, featuring alloy wheels, swoopy, ill-fitting sideskirts and a rear spoiler. A fuel injected engine became available on the 1.3 and 1.5 models in August 1996.

Australian market

The Samara was introduced into the Australian market in July 1988, and was offered in three-door and convertible body styles. A three-door variant called the Bizivan was also offered, which was sold without rear seats in order to qualify as a commercial van, and therefore, lower import duties. In 1990, the range was pared down to a single five-door model, marketed as the Lada Cevaro. The 3-door returned in 1994 as the Lada Volante and the four-door was introduced as the Lada Sable. Imports had ceased by 1996.

In 1988, approximately 6,000 Lada Samaras were modified by Peter Brock's Special Vehicles operation that had previously made high performance Holden Commodores. The cars would be known as the Lada Samara Sedan Brock Delux and included a few subtle Brock-devised suspension tweaks to improve the car's low-speed ride, as well as a special body kit. It cost about A$3,000 more than the base model Samara.

Samara 2

After 1997, the Samara was mostly sold in its homeland only, although it was still sold in some foreign markets with less strict emissions regulations. The Samara 2, a lightly facelifted version with a fuel-injected version of the 1,499 cc engine and a better gearbox, went on sale in limited numbers as the 2115 (four-door sedan) in 1997, built at the VAZ special vehicles unit. Brakes and interior were also upgraded, incorporating parts from the VAZ 2110. Full production on the main line in Togliatti began in 2000, in 2002 a five-door (2114) was added and the 2113 three-door followed in September 2004. The three-door was not originally planned to be built, but was added as a response to strong dealer demand. The last first generation Samara rolled off the Togliatti production line in 2004, ending 20 years of production there. Production of the "classic" Samara 2109/21099 continued at ZAZ in Ukraine as of 2004, and from May 2007 in Kazakhstan (Azia Avto).

In January 2007, an upgraded Samara 2, using the modern 1.6-litre VAZ-11183-20 engine first seen in the VAZ 2110 went on sale. While the Lada 110 and the Lada Priora have taken much of the Samara's market share at home, the Samara retains a clear price advantage and steady demand. The production of sedan Lada Samara 2 was stopped in December 2012; hatchbacks were still assembled until the end of 2013.

Technical specifications
Available Trims: many were available through the years and on different markets. Most of trim options were actually importer upgrades.

Engine type
Engine designation: VAZ 21081, VAZ 2108, VAZ 21083, VAZ 21084; VAZ 415 (wankel type)
Valvetrain: OHC
Displacement (cc): 1100, 1288, 1500, 1568; 2x654 for Wankel engine
Bore (mm): 76.0, 76.0, 82.0, 82.0
Stroke (mm): 60.6, 71.0, 71.0, 74.2
Compression Ratio: 9.0 :1, 9.8:1, 9.8:1, 9,8:1
Net Power:  @5600,  @5600,  @4800,  @4800;  @6000 for Wankel engine
Fuel System: 2 barrel carburettor or multipoint electronic fuel injection
Recommended Fuel: Regular Unleaded, 87 Octane

Drivetrain
Configuration :
Front-engine, front-wheel-drive
Transmission :
4 or 5 forward synchromesh, 1 reverse (4-speed gearbox was used on early cars)

Chassis
Type :
3-door hatchback (VAZ 2108)
5-door hatchback (VAZ 2109)
4-door sedan (VAZ 21099)
Later styling of all Samara vehicles was updated, and they received new designations:
3-door hatchback (VAZ 2113)
5-door hatchback (VAZ 2114)
4-door sedan (VAZ 2115)
There are various commercial and specialty conversions.
Suspension (front): MacPherson strut with coil spring
Suspension (rear): Longitudinal arms and cross beam with coil springs
Steering (type): Rack-and-pinion
Brakes (type): Power-assisted
Brakes (front): Discs
Brakes (Rear): Drums
Wheels (size): 13 inch
Tires (type): Steel-belted all-season radials
Tires (size and Rating): 165/70x13

Safety by modern standards
The RosLada-made 2109 version of the Samara scored 2.7 points out of 16 in a frontal crash test conducted by the Russian ARCAP safety assessment program in 2002, demonstrating a durable car body but lacking modern passive safety equipment. Two years later, the 2114 five-door variant was awarded half a star out of a possible four by ARCAP, showing moderate pressure on the head, neck, chest and hips of the crash test dummy but excessive on the shins.

Trims

First generation
For 2003, there were three levels trims: Standard (the notation (standing after the index model) 00, models with distributed injection of fuel 20, such as the VAZ-21083-00), Norma (the notation 01 and 21) and Luxe (the notation 02 and 22) that vehicles with different bodies differed.

In the version with body three-door hatchback Standard grade includes the onboard control system, tweed seat upholstery, metallic color, luggage rack, front head restraints; in version 20 were also microprocessor ignition system, the electro-door locks, immobilizer. In the configuration Norma added tweed seat covers with pockets in the front seats, door trim tweed, trim the trunk, anti-glare visor with mirror; in the version of 21 were also converter and a system for collecting gasoline vapors. In the Luxe configuration added headlamp cleaning system, exterior mirrors with antidazzle effect and tinted windows.

In the version with five-door hatchback body Standard equipment included a tweed seat upholstery with pockets in the front seats, fabric inserts tweed upholstered doors, trunk trim, trunk rack, front head restraints, metallic color; version of the 20 had the same differences as in other bodies. In the configuration Norma added rear headrests and anti-glare visor with mirror. In the Luxe configuration added front electric windows and fog lamps.

In the version with the sedan body configuration were the same as the five-door hatchback, with the exception of the fog lights that have appeared in version Norma.

Second generation
There were two levels of equipment: Norma and Luxe. The Norma grade included steel wheels, immobilizer, central locking, tweed seat upholstery and door, height adjustable steering column, front electric windows, front head restraints, tailgate spoiler / tailgate, moldings on the doors. Luxe trim different caps on the wheels, trip computer, velvet upholstery seats and doors, athermal glass windows, rear headrests, a mirror in the sun visor of the passenger and heated front seats.

See also
Lada 110

References
Citations

Bibliography

Further reading

External links

 Lada Cars reviews, images, infos (English)
 Lada Samara I, II Forum, help, infos (Rus)
 Data and Photos in AutoInf catalogue (Rus)

Samara
Compact cars
Sedans
ARCAP small family cars
Soviet automobiles
1990s cars
2000s cars
2010s cars
Cars introduced in 1984
Cars of Russia
Cars discontinued in 2013